Kilclief (from the Irish Cill Cléithe meaning 'church of wattle') is a civil parish in County Down, Northern Ireland. It is situated in the historic baronies of Lecale Lower and Lecale Upper. It is also a townland of 623 acres.

The site of Kilclief parish church dates from the early Christian period and was granted by Bishop Malachy 3rd to the Abbey of Saint Patrick of Down in 1183.

Townlands
Kilclief civil parish contains the following townlands:

Acre McCricket
Carrowdressex
Cloghy
Commonreagh
Glebe
Isle McCricket
Kilclief
Ringreagh
Ross
Rossglass
Tullyfoyle Lower
Tullyfoyle Upper

See also
Kilclief Castle
List of civil parishes of County Down

References

 
Townlands of County Down